Richard Warren Schickel (February 10, 1933 – February 18, 2017) was an American film historian, journalist, author, documentarian, and film and literary critic. He was a film critic for Time magazine from 1965–2010, and also wrote for Life magazine and the Los Angeles Times Book Review. His last writings about film were for Truthdig.

He was interviewed in For the Love of Movies: The Story of American Film Criticism (2009). In this documentary film, he discusses early film critics Frank E. Woods, Robert E. Sherwood, and Otis Ferguson, and tells of how, in the 1960s, he, Pauline Kael, and Andrew Sarris, rejected moralizing opposition of the older Bosley Crowther of The New York Times who had railed against violent movies such as Bonnie and Clyde (1967). In addition to film, Schickel also critiqued and documented cartoons, particularly Peanuts.

Personal life
Schickel was born in Milwaukee, Wisconsin, the son of Helen (née Hendricks) and Edward John Schickel.

Schickel had two daughters. Following a series of strokes, he died in Los Angeles on February 18, 2017, eight days after his 84th birthday.

Honors
Schickel received a Guggenheim Fellowship in 1964. He also lectured at Yale University and University of Southern California's School of Film and Television.

Books
 The World of Carnegie Hall (1960)
 The Stars (1962)
 The Gentle Knight (1964)
 Movies: The history of an Art and an Institution (1964)
 The World of Goya, 1746–1828 (1968)
 The Disney Version: The Life, Times, Art and Commerce of Walt Disney (1968); revised editions: 1984, 1997
 The Museum (1970)
 Second Sight: Notes on Some Movies 1965–1970 (1972)
 His Picture in the Papers: A Speculation on Celebrity in America Based on the Life of Douglas Fairbanks, Sr. (1974)
 Harold Lloyd: The Shape of Laughter (1974)
 The World of Tennis (1975)
 The Men Who Made The Movies (1975)
 Douglas Fairbanks: The First Celebrity (1976)
 Another I, Another You: A Novel (1978)
 Singled Out: A Civilized Guide to Sex and Sensibility for the Suddenly Single Man—or Woman (1981)
 Cary Grant: A Celebration (1983)
 D.W. Griffith: An American Life (1984); British Film Institute Book Prize, 1985
 Intimate Strangers: The Culture of Celebrity (1985) (aka Common Fame: The Culture of Celebrity); revised 2000
 Lena by Lena Horne and Richard Schickel
 James Cagney: A Celebration (1986)
 Gary Cooper (1986) 
 Striking Poses: Photographs from the Kobal Collection (1987)
 Carnegie Hall: The First One Hundred Years by Richard Schickel and Michael Walsh (1987)
 Schickel on Film: Encounters—Critical and Personal—With Movie Immortals (1989)
 Brando: A Life in Our Times (1991)
 Double Indemnity (BFI Film Classics) (1992)
 Clint Eastwood: A Biography (1996)
 Hollywood at Home: A Family Album 1950–1965 (1998)
 Matinee Idylls: Reflections on the Movies (1999)
 Good Morning, Mr. Zip Zip Zip: Movies, Memory and World War II (2003)
 Woody Allen: A Life in Film (2004)
 Elia Kazan: A Biography (2005)
 Bogie: A Celebration of the Life and Films of Humphrey Bogart (2006) 
 The Essential Chaplin: Perspectives on the Life and Art of the Great Comedian (2006) (editor)
 Conversations with Scorsese (2011)
 Steven Spielberg: A Retrospective (2012)
 Keepers: The Greatest Films - and Personal Favorites - of a Moviegoing Lifetime (2015)

Documentaries
The Men Who Made the Movies (1973), eight-part series, PBS, Emmy nominated
Into the Morning: Willa Cather's America (1975)
Life Goes to the Movies (writer, 1976), NBC, Emmy nominated
The Making of Star Wars (writer, 1977), ABC
Funny Business (1978), CBS
The Horror Show (1979), CBS
SP FX: The Empire Strikes Back (writer, 1980), CBS
James Cagney: That Yankee Doodle Dandy (1981), PBS
From Star Wars to Jedi: The Making of a Saga (writer, 1983), PBS
Minnelli on Minnelli: Liza Remembers Vincente (1987), PBS, Emmy nominated
Happy Anniversary 007: 25 Years of James Bond (writer, 1987), ABC
Cary Grant: A Celebration of a Leading Man (writer, 1988), ABC
Gary Cooper: American Life, American Legend (1989), TNT
Myrna Loy: So Nice to Come Home to (1991), TNT
Barbara Stanwyck: Fire and Desire (1991), TNT
Eastwood & Co : Making Unforgiven (1992), ABC
Hollywood on Hollywood (1993), AMC
Elia Kazan: A Director's Journey (1995), AMC, Emmy nominated
Eastwood on Eastwood (1997)
The Harryhausen Chronicles (1998), PBS 
AFI's 100 Years...100 Stars: America's Greatest Screen Legends (writer, 1999), CBS
AFI's 100 Years...100 Laughs: America's Funniest Movies (writer, 2000), CBS
Shooting War: World War II Combat Cameramen (2000), ABC, Emmy nominated
Woody Allen: A Life in Film (2002), TCM
The Men Who Made the Movies: Samuel Fuller (2002), TCM
Charlie: The Life and Art of Charles Chaplin (2003)
Scorsese on Scorsese (2004), TCM
Watch the Skies!: Science Fiction, the 1950s and Us (2005), TCM
Spielberg on Spielberg (2007), TCM
Cannes: All Access (2007)
Ron Howard: 50 Years in Film (2008), TCM
You Must Remember This: The Warner Bros. Story (2008), three-part series, PBS
The Eastwood Factor (2010)
Eastwood Directs: The Untold Story (2013)

DVD commentaries
The Big Red One
The Big Trail
City for Conquest
Dirty Harry
La Dolce Vita
Double Indemnity
East of Eden
El Dorado, with actor Edward Asner and author Todd McCarthy
Gentleman's Agreement, with actresses Celeste Holm and June Havoc
Gilda
The Good, the Bad and the Ugly
Hangover Square
The Hustler, with actor Paul Newman, film historian Jeff Young, and other participants
Leave Her to Heaven, with actor Darryl Hickman
The Mark of Zorro
On the Waterfront, with Elia Kazan biographer Jeff Young
Once Upon a Time in America
Pin Up Girl
The Purple Heart
Rebecca
Rio Bravo, with filmmaker John Carpenter
Ryan's Daughter, with director David Lean's wife Lady Sandra Lean, actress Sarah Miles, and other participants
Side Street
Somebody Up There Likes Me, with director Robert Wise, actors Paul Newman and Robert Loggia, and filmmaker Martin Scorsese
Strangers on a Train, with filmmaker Peter Bogdanovich, Psycho screenwriter Joseph Stefano, Patricia Highsmith biographer Andrew Wilson, and other participants
Sudden Impact
Titanic
Unforgiven
Whirlpool

See also
 Walt Disney (2015 PBS film)

References

External links

 (archived in 2015)

 1989 audio interview with Richard Schickel  at Wired for Books by Don Swaim

1933 births
2017 deaths
20th-century American male writers
20th-century American non-fiction writers
21st-century American male writers
21st-century American non-fiction writers
American documentary film directors
American film critics
National Society of Film Critics Members
American film historians
American male non-fiction writers
Film theorists
Historians from Wisconsin
Time (magazine) people
Writers from Milwaukee